Mallotus pleiogynus is a species of the spurge family (Euphorbiaceae). It is found in New Guinea.

pleiogynum